Theotima minutissima is a minute (0.9mm) spider.

Distribution
With a pantropical distributionT. minutissima occurs in Panama, the Philippines, Indonesia, Thailand and Guam. It is especially abundant in the tropical forest leaf litter on El Yunque, Puerto Rico.

However, with more than a thousand specimens collected over many years, none has ever been a male. It is now known that at least this species, and possibly others in the genus Theotima, reproduce parthenogenetically.

Its preferred habitat is litter composed of smaller leaves in second growth forests with understory shrubs or in those forests with damper and more easily decayed leaves such as mahogany. The species prefers elevations less than 800m.

References

 Edwards (2003): Observations of Theotima minutissimus (Araneae, Ochyroceratidae), a parthenogenetic spider. The Journal of Arachnology 31:274-277 PDF

Ochyroceratidae
Pantropical spiders
Arthropods of Puerto Rico
Spiders of Central America
Arthropods of the Philippines
Arthropods of Thailand
Spiders described in 1929
Taxa named by Alexander Petrunkevitch